Gruta   is a village in Grudziądz County, Kuyavian-Pomeranian Voivodeship, in north-central Poland. It is the seat of the gmina (administrative district) called Gmina Gruta.

The village has a population of 1,600.

References

Gruta
Pomeranian Voivodeship (1919–1939)